The 2018–19 ATK season was the club's fifth season since its establishment in 2014 and their fifth season in the Indian Super League. The fifth edition of ISL commenced with a new look ATK renewing its seasonal rivalry against Kerala Blasters FC on Saturday, 29 September, at the Vivekananda Yuba Bharati Krirangan.

Background

Transfers

After a disappointing season, ATK has appointed Sanjoy Sen as their mentor to recruit national players. The former Mohun Bagan A.C. head coach roped in some of his own former players who he had the experience of working with, along with former ATK players Arnab Mondal and Cavin Lobo.

In

Out

Pre Season and friendlies
ATK went to Spain on 18 August for their pre-season. This campaign will end on 15 September. In Spain they played some friendly matches with local clubs and one match with Premier League club Fulham F.C.

They played their first match on 31 August with Lorca FC and won by one goal scored by Kalu Uche. In the second friendly they won by one goal again by defeating Spanish club Real Murcia. ATK played their third match with highly competitive Premier League club Fulham F.C. and defeated just by a whisker.

Competitions

Indian Super League

Table

Matches

Super Cup

As one of the top six teams in 2018–19 Indian Super League, ATK qualified for the main round in 2019 Indian Super Cup. ATK were scheduled to play the I-League side, Real Kashmir FC in Round of 16 match.
 
ATK defeated Real Kashmir Fc by 3 - 1 to reach quarter finals of Super cup. Now they will face Indian Super League team Delhi Dynamos in quarters.

Goalscorers

Goalscorers (Against)

Player information

Current squad

Management

References

ATK (football club) seasons
ATK